David Conway Turner (born May 1965) is a British businessperson. In August 2000, he became a managing director of the financial publishing company Citywire.

Career
He was at the Financial Times for ten years where he was publisher of all the FT Group's business publications.

Turner joined Citywire shortly after its 1999 launch.

See also
 List of people from London

References

1965 births
20th-century English businesspeople
20th-century publishers (people)
21st-century English businesspeople
Place of birth missing (living people)
British publishers (people)
Businesspeople from London
Corporate executives
Financial Times people
Living people